UFC on Fox: Velasquez vs. dos Santos (also known as UFC on Fox 1) was a mixed martial arts event held by the Ultimate Fighting Championship on November 12, 2011 at the Honda Center in Anaheim, California.

Background
This card marked the UFC's debut on the Fox Network. Zuffa CEO Lorenzo Fertitta confirmed that the debut show would be a one-hour special with only the main event airing live on television, but a full preliminary card taking place beforehand.

Fox Deportes aired the Guida vs. Henderson, Poirier vs. Garza, Swanson vs. Lamas, and Johnson vs. Harvison fights.
 	
The winner of the Clay Guida/Benson Henderson fight determined who was next to get a title shot against Frankie Edgar (the reigning champion at the time), at UFC 144 in Japan.

The UFC on Fox main event broadcast marked the most-watched live hour ever for MMA in the United States and averaged 5.7 million viewers.  The ratings peaked in the United States at 8.8 million viewers for the main event.

Results

Bonus awards
Fighters were awarded $65,000 bonuses.

 Fight of the Night:  Clay Guida vs.  Benson Henderson
 Knockout of the Night:  Junior dos Santos
 Submission of the Night:  Ricardo Lamas

Reported payout
The following is the reported payout to the fighters as reported to the California State Athletic Commission. It does not include sponsor money or "locker room" bonuses often given by the UFC and also do not include the UFC's traditional "fight night" bonuses.

Junior dos Santos: $220,000 ($110,000 win bonus) def. Cain Velasquez: $100,000
Ben Henderson: $60,000 ($30,000 win bonus) def. Clay Guida: $40,000
Dustin Poirier: $20,000 ($10,000 win bonus) def. Pablo Garza: $8,000
Ricardo Lamas: $20,000 ($10,000 win bonus) def. Cub Swanson: $15,000
DaMarques Johnson: $28,000 ($14,000 win bonus) def. Clay Harvison: $8,000
Darren Uyenoyama: $12,000 ($6,000 win bonus) def. Norifumi Yamamoto: $15,000
Robert Peralta: $16,000 ($8,000 win bonus) def. Mackens Semerzier: $8,000
Alex Caceres: $16,000 ($8,000 win bonus) def. Cole Escovedo: $6,000
Mike Pierce: $36,000 ($18,000 win bonus) def. Paul Bradley: $8,000
Aaron Rosa: $12,000 ($6,000 win bonus) def. Matt Lucas: $6,000

See also
List of UFC events

References

External links
Official UFC past events page
UFC events results at Sherdog.com

Fox UFC
2011 in mixed martial arts
Mixed martial arts in Anaheim, California
Sports competitions in Anaheim, California
2011 in sports in California
Events in Anaheim, California